Vyacheslav Vladimirovich Gladkov (born 15 January 1969) is a Russian statesman and politician. He became the governor of the Belgorod Region on 27 September 2021, after serving as its acting governor since 18 November 2020. He is a member of the United Russia party.

He was the Deputy Governor of Sevastopol from 28 July 2016 to 16 April 2018, and was the Deputy Prime Minister of the Stavropol Krai - Chief of Staff of the Government of the Stavropol Krai from 13 June 2018 to 18 November 2020.

Biography
Vyacheslav Gladkov was born on 15 January 1969 in the village of Kuchki, Penza Oblast, Russia.

Education
In 1996, he graduated from Saint Petersburg State University of Economics and Finance with a degree in economics. He later received additional education, graduating from Penza State University with a degree in municipal administration. In 2012, he completed a master's degree in RANChIGS with a degree in "Master of Management".

He is a candidate of Economic Sciences. In 2012, at the Grozny State Oil Technical University, named after Academician MD Millionshchikov, Gladkov defended his dissertation on "Formation and development of regional agricultural cooperative markets (based on materials from the Penza Oblast)."

He is a graduate of the third stream of the Program for training the personnel management reserve of the civil service, the so-called "school of governors".

Work in Penza Oblast
Gladokov began his career in 1997, at OAO Penza Construction Department. Initially as a contract and claims economist, but in the same year he was appointed head of the financial group of centralized accounting.

In 2000, he transferred to the civil service and for the next 16 years worked in the administration of the city of Zarechny, Penza Oblast. He first worked as a deputy head, and then as head of the economic department for economics and development of market relations. From 2002 to 2005, he was the Deputy Head of the Zarechny Administration for Economics and Entrepreneurship Development, and in 2009, he was the First Deputy Head of the Administration.

On 30 October 2008, he joined the United Russia party. In the same year, at the competition of municipalities, held by the Ministry of Regional Development, he became one of the winners in the nomination "Best Municipal Employee".

From 24 April 2009 to 23 September 2016, Gladkov was the mayor of Zarechny. In the fall of 2015, it became known about the preparation of a draft decree of the President of the Russian Federation to remove from 1 January 2016 the status of a closed administrative-territorial entity from six cities, including the "city of nuclear scientists" in Zarechny. Gladkov then stated that "this is categorically impossible to do," and eventually managed to lobby for the preservation of the status of ZATO with all its benefits.

Work in Sevastopol and the Stavropol Krai
From September 2016, to the end of March 2018, Gladkov worked as Deputy Governor of Sevastopol under Dmitry Ovsyannikov for domestic policy. According to Kommersant sources, Gladkov was sent to Sevastopol to solve two tasks: to elect Dmitry Ovsyannikov (at that time, he was elected in direct elections in September 2017) and to hold presidential elections, which Vladimir Putin received 90.19% with a turnout of slightly above 70%. Immediately after the successful presidential campaign, Gladkov wanted to resign voluntarily, but remained in office until June, when he was found a replacement.

On 13 June 2018, the Governor of the Stavropol Krai, Vladimir Vladimirov appointed Gladkov his Deputy Chairman of the Regional Government for Internal Policy, at the same time Gladkov was appointed Chief of Staff of the Government of the Stavropol Krai. After re-election in the 2019 elections, Vladimirov formed a new government, and Gladkov retained his position and remained Deputy Prime Minister of the Stavropol Krai - Chief of Staff of the Government of the region. While working in Stavropol, he was a member of the presidium of the Stavropol regional political council of the United Russia party.

Governor of the Belgorod Oblast
On 18 November 2020, by Decree of President Putin, Gladkov was appointed acting governor of the Belgorod Oblast until a person elected head of the region takes office. The gubernatorial elections are scheduled for the next single voting day on 19 September 2021.

He replaced Denis Butsayev, the acting governor from September 22 to November 18, 2020, after Yevgeny Savchenko, who had headed the Belgorod Oblast for almost 27 years, whom he had resigned voluntarily.

After his appointment, Gladkov stated that "one has arrived so far" and "it is not necessary to wait for the personnel revolution," calling the fight against the coronavirus, increasing the income of Belgorod residents and implementing national projects a priority.

Winner the gubernatorial election on 19 September 2021 with a result of 78.79%. Took office as governor on 27 September of the same year.

Family
He is married, and has four children and one granddaughter.

Income and property
The amount of declared income for 2019 amounted to 3,427,000 rubles, spouse's - 1,707,000 rubles.

References

1969 births
Living people
United Russia politicians
People from Penza Oblast
Governors of Belgorod Oblast
Saint Petersburg University of Economics and Finance alumni
Russian Presidential Academy of National Economy and Public Administration alumni